Van Gulik (also Van Gulick and Van der Gulik) is a Dutch toponymic surname, meaning "from Gulik" (Duchy of Jülich). The counts and dukes of Jülich were named "van Gulik" in the local Meuse-Rhenish dialect. Other notable people with the surname include:

David Van der Gulik (born 1983), Canadian ice hockey player
Dirk-Willem van Gulik (born 1968), Dutch businessman
Robert van Gulik (1910–1967), Dutch orientalist, diplomat, musician, and writer
Willem van Gulik (died 1304), Flemish revolt leader

See also
Gulick, an Anglicised version of the surname

Dutch-language surnames
Surnames of Dutch origin